Tan Sri Dato' Seri Tuan Guru Haji Abdul Hadi bin Awang  (Jawi: عبدالهادي بن اواڠ; born 20 October 1947) is a Malaysian politician and religious teacher who has served as Member of Parliament (MP) for Marang since October 1990, 7th President of the Malaysian Islamic Party (PAS), an Islamist political party and a component party of Perikatan Nasional (PN) coalition, since July 2002. He served as Leader of the Opposition from July 2002 to March 2004, Menteri Besar of Terengganu from December 1999 to March 2004 and Member of the Terengganu State Legislative Assembly (MLA) for Ru Rendang from 1986 until 2018. At the international level, he also serves as vice-president of the International Union of Muslim Scholars.

Hadi received his education in neighbourhood schools before furthering his studies at the Islamic University of Madinah between 1969 and 1973, and later at Al-Azhar University. Upon his return to Malaysia, he joined Angkatan Belia Islam Malaysia (ABIM) in 1977, where he quickly became its Terengganu state chief. A year later, Hadi joined the Malaysian Islamic Party (PAS) and contested a parliamentary seat in the 1978 general election. He rose quickly through the ranks. He became PAS deputy president in 1989 when Fadzil Noor was elected to the party presidency. He remained deputy president until 2002, when Fadzil died of a heart attack, resulting in Hadi succeeding him as PAS President.

Early life and family

Hadi was born on 20 October 1947, in Kampung Rusila, Marang, Terengganu. He is the fifth child of nine siblings; four of them are deceased. His father's name was Haji Awang Mohamad bin Abd Rahman while his mother was Hajjah Aminah Yusuf. They are also deceased. His father who was Tok Guru in Kampung Rusila was also a political activist of Hizbul Muslimin Terengganu. Similarly, his bonds were the place of reference and the focus of society, especially in religious matters.
Hizbul Muslimin was banned by the colonists, at the will of the ruling party. A few years after the ban, Haji Awang Mohammad emerged as one of the earliest to introduce the struggle of the Malay Se-Malaya (PAS) Society in Terengganu.

Education
Tuan Guru Abdul Hadi Awang was given an early education by his father beginning in 1955. Later, he was educated formally at the Rusila National School before continuing his secondary education at Marang Religious School. He then pursued Sanawi's degree at the Sultan Zainal Abidin Religious Secondary School, Kuala Terengganu. In addition, he studied religion, Arabic and politics with his father.

He furthered his studies at the Islamic University of Madinah for a Shariah bachelor's degree funding by the Kingdom of Saudi Arabia with the support of the then-vice president of the Islamic University of Madinah Sheikh Abdul Aziz bin Abdullah.

After about four years in the Arabian Peninsula (1969–1973), he earned his first degree in Islamic Shariah. He furthered his master's degree at Al-Azhar University, Cairo, Egypt, in Siyasah Syar'iyyah (Political Science) from 1974 to 1976.

Early career

Community education
Shortly after finishing his studies and returning to his homeland, in 1976, his father died. Hadi then decided to continue his father's duty of being a khatib and delivering khutbah (a sermon) every Friday morning.

Non-government organization
He served as an officer for the Terengganu Islamic Foundation from 1977 to 1978, and at the same time as Terengganu Chief of Angkatan Belia Islam Malaysia (ABIM).

In 1978, he began teaching at the Maahad Al-Ikhwan (Institute of Feed), a private school set up by a few young PAS youths in Mengadang Akar, Kuala Terengganu.

In 1982, when ABIM's president, Datuk Seri Anwar Ibrahim left the organization and joined the United Malays National Organisation (UMNO), Abdul Hadi joined PAS with Ustaz Fadzil Noor and Datuk Nakhaie Ahmad.

Along with these three, some of the ABIM leaders who joined PAS included: Tuan Haji Mohamad Sabu, Ustaz Abdul Ghani Shamsuddin, Datuk Paduka Husam Musa, Datuk Tuan Ibrahim Tuan Man, Ustaz Abu Bakar Chik, Ustaz Muhammad Mustafa and Datuk Mohammad Daud Iraqi.

Political career

Early political career
Hadi has been active in politics since 1964 when he was studying in high school. He has been entrusted as a branch secretary in the PAS village Rusila, Marang.

In 1976, he was appointed Terengganu PAS youth chief and the Central PAS Youth Council Exco. In 1977, he was elected to the Central PAS Working Committee. In 1978, he was appointed acting vice president of the Central Center and later confirmed to the post in 1980. In 1983, he and Datuk Nakhaei Ahmad were once again elected as PAS vice presidents. In 1989, he was elected PAS deputy president after Dato' Fadzil Noor was elected president of PAS.

Following the death of Ustaz Fadzil Noor, he was appointed acting president of PAS in 2003. He became PAS president after being ratified at the convention in 2005.

An the 61st PAS Muktamar, he was challenged for the first time for the post of PAS president by Ustaz Ahmad Awang. However, he managed to defeat his challenger with a majority of 695 votes.

Rose to prominance
He joined the election after returning home in 1978 where he was entrusted by PAS to contest the 1978 General Election in Dun Marang representing PAS. He lost by 64 votes to BN's Tengku Zahid Tengku Musa. In the 1982 General Election, he was nominated by PAS for the Marang State Legislative Assembly and won with a majority of 320 votes, but lost in the Dungun Parliament, which was also contested, to Haji Awang Jabar.

In the 1982 election, four other PAS leaders in Terengganu won their state seats—Haji Mustafa Ali, Haji Harun Taliib, Haji Abu Bakar Chik, and Haji Wan Abdul Mutalib Embong.

In 1986, he won again at DUN Ru Rendang (the new name for Dun Marang after redelineation) defeating Abdul Latif Muda and has retained it until now. However, for Marang's parliamentary seat that year, he lost to Datuk Abdul Rahman Bakar. He won it in 1990, 1995 and 1999.

After PAS's victory in Terengganu in November 1999, he was appointed Menteri Besar of Terengganu until March 2004, as well as being Marang member of parliament. He was also opposition leader from 2003 to 2004, replacing Almarhum Ustaz Fadzil Noor.

He lost to Abdul Rahman in 2004 but won again in 2008.

In Malaysia's 2013 General Election, he managed to maintain both the unbeatable seats. He won the Marang Parliament with a majority of 5124 votes, defeating Datuk Yahya Khatib Muhammad from BN. He also won the Ru Rendang state seat with a majority of 2819, defeating Nik Dir Nik Wan Ku from BN.

Menteri Besar of Terengganu

Early time
Abdul Hadi Awang was elected the 11th Menteri Besar of Terengganu officially on Tuesday, 22 Syaaban 1420 corresponding to 30 November 1999, when he was 52 years old. The ceremony for the declaration of the appointment of the chief minister and 10 members of the State Executive Council were held at Istana Maziah, Kuala Terengganu, on 2 December 1999.

He was also the state commissioner for Terengganu when he was appointed Menteri Besar to replace Dato 'Seri Wan Mokhtar Ahmad after PAS won 28 of the 32 state seats in Terengganu in the 10th general election. The party also won seven out of eight temporary parliamentary seats; the other parliamentary seat was won by Parti Keadilan Rakyat.

Hadi I cabinet of Terengganu

YAB Datuk Seri Tuan Guru Haji Abdul Hadi Awang
President
Chairman of the Land, Mines and Forestry Committee, Chairman of the Finance and Investment Committee
YB Dato 'Haji Mustafa Ali
State Executive Councilor
Chairman of the Economic, Petroleum, Industrial and Human Resources Development Committee
(Allahyarham) YB Dato 'Tuan Guru Haji Harun Taib
State Executive Councilor
Chairman of the Committee on Education, Da'wah and Shariah Implementation
YB Dato 'Haji Wan Abdul Mutalib Embong
State Executive Councilor
Chairman of the Local Government, Housing and Environment Committee
(Allahyarham) YB Dato 'Ustaz Abu Bakar Chik
State Executive Councilor
Chairman of the Committee on Agriculture, Fisheries and Livestock
YB Tun Dato Mohd Salleh Abas
State Executive Councilor
Chairman of Hisbah Committee and Special Duties
YB Tuan Haji Mohd Abdul Wahid Endut
State Executive Councilor
Chairman of the Committee on Entrepreneur Development, Small Business and Consumer Affairs
YB Tuan Haji Yahaya Ali
State Executive Councilor
Chairman of the Infrastructure Development Committee, Public Utilities and Communications
YB Ustaz Haji Abu Bakar Abdullah
State Executive Councilor
Chairman of the Welfare, Social and Health Committee
(Allahyaham) YB Ustaz Haji Awang Dagang Jusoh
State Executive Councilor
Chairman of Women and Non-Muslim Affairs Committee
YB Ustaz Haji Wan Hassan Mohd Ramli
State Executive Councilor
Chairman of the Committee, Sports, Culture and Tourism\

Achievement
Among his achievements were in the education sector where he helped consolidate both formal and informal educational institutions in the country. He instituted a higher zakat (funds) collection from 2000 to 2004 with a total of RM122.4 million compared to 1990-1999 under the UMNO administration where the total was only RM85 million. In the case of land reform, he reduced the land charge premium from 20% to 10% and exceeded the target to settle an arrears of 50,000 land dispute cases each year.

He instituted transparency in logging activities increasing the premium of RM60.6 million to 15,000ha in 2003 compared to premium of RM17.9 million for the same amount of hectares during the UMNO administration in 1997. He helped to reduce the poverty rate from 17.3% to 14%;

He helped introduce Five Working Days policy in 1999, which was followed by the Federal Government in 2000. He introduced 90 days maternity leave and seven days leave for fathers. He assisted with the abolition of the pedicab permit and the fees for small traders, abolished toll collection at the Sultan Mahmud Bridge, and re-established the Islamic Law in the state constitution with the introduction of several laws based on the Al-Quran and As-Sunnah.

International involvement

While an overseas student
Hadi began to work internationally in Madinah when he became the Head of Malaysian Students of the Islamic University of Madinah. In addition, he is also responsible for the Confederation of Southeast Asian Students in Medina.

At Medina, two Ikhwan figures, Professor Dr. Muhammad Al-Wakeel and Sheikh Said Hawwa became his mentors for Siasah Syar'iyyah. He also learned from Dr. Abdul Satar Al Khudsi who was active in the Muslim Brotherhood at that time.

In Egypt, he became the secretary of the Syariah Section and the Law of the Federation of the Arab Republic of Egypt.

Represents Malaysian Islamic movement
As PAS senior leader, Hadi not only led the Islamic movement in Malaysia, but was also actively involved on the international stage with other Islamic movements addressing the problems of the Ummah (Islamic community).

In 1990 he was a member of the Joint Coordinating Committee of Islamic Political Parties to address Palestinian issues, based in Amman, Jordan. He was a supporter of Harakah al-Muqawwamat al-Islamiyyah (HAMAS). Along with the leadership of HAMAS, as a member of the Muslim Brotherhood he supported the defense of the Palestinian issue. He urged the Government of Malaysia to recognize the victory of Hamas as a legitimate government. He led a delegation of PAS parliamentarians and Islamic NGOs in an attempt to enter Gaza City but was barred.

Hadi was involved with the Al-Majma 'al-Alami li al-Taqrib Baina al-Mazahib al-Islamiah (International Council for Approach of Islamic Schools), based in Tehran, Iran, and the International Committee of the International Secretariat for the Defense of Baitul Maqdis based in Amman, Jordan. He was a member of delegate MPs of Islamic parties led by Dr. Najmuddin Erbakan, a former Turkish prime minister, who met with UN Secretary-General, Boutros Boutros-Ghali, and met the United States Senate; the delegates of Parti Islam MPs who visited Europe headed by Dr. Necmettin Erbakan; a delegate of Islamic party leaders from around the world who met the rulers and presidents of the countries of West Asia before the Gulf War; a delegate of the world leaders of Islamic movements who visited Baghdad at the invitation of Iraq's Prime Minister, Saddam Hussien during the Gulf War crisis; a member of the delegation of Islamic movement leaders across the globe headed by Muslim Brotherhood leader Sheikh Mustafa Masyhur who visited Afghanistan, to help enforce the Islamic state and to avoid conflicts between Muslim pilgrims who were cracking after the Russian withdrawal from Afghanistan. In addition to Mr Abdul Hadi Awang, Dato 'Fadzil Noor, then President of PAS, also participated.

Hadi was a member of the International Islamic Movement Secretariat Committee headquartered in Istanbul, Turkey in 1994. He was often invited to attend the Ijtima 'Am organized by Jamaat-e-Islami Pakistan, and some Indonesian Islamic movements such as the Prosperous Justice Party and the Star Moon Party.

He was a speaker at the International Seminar on Islamic Unity in the face of Bosnia-Herzegovina problems and represented PAS at the 5th World Islamic Organization's Muktamar in Istanbul in 1996. He gave a speech titled "Islamic Awakening: His Lack of Wisdom" at the International Islamic Revival Conference in Tehran on 24 September 2011. The conference, attended by 700 delegates from all Muslim countries, discussed the latest conflicts in West Asia such as Egypt, Tunisia, Libya, Yemen, Syria and Palestine.

He represented Malaysia's Islamic movement (PAS) to the 22nd International Muslim Community Congress in Istanbul, Turkey in May 2013. It was also attended by the leader of Tunisia's An-Nahdah, Rashid al-Ghannushi; from Palestinian HAMAS, Ismail Haniyeh and Khaled Meshal; from Egyptian Muslim Brotherhood, Muhammad Badie; from Jamaat-e-Islami Pakistan, Syed Munawar Hassan; and from the Syrian Muslim Brotherhood, Riyadh al-Sakfa. The congress also heard a keynote address by two Islamic State leaders, Dr. Mohamed Morsi (Egypt) and Mahmoud Ahmadinejad (Iran).

Hadi was appointed as World Muslim Ulama Union deputy president, together with Dr. Ahmad Raysuni and Sheikh Al-Khalili headed by Dr. Yusuf al-Qaradawi in 2014.

He delivered the prime lectures at S. Rajaratnam School of International Studies(RSIS), Nanyang Technological University in Singapore on 28 April 2015.

Controversies and issues

Amanat Hadi
Amanat Hadi refers to the dark period in the 1980s, when Hadi Awang was a PAS firebrand. It was the beginning of the era of "kafir mengkafir" (calling fellow Muslims infidels due to different political beliefs) which Hadi had popularized throughout the villages of Malaysia.

Hadi delivered this infamous Amanat Hadi sermon at Kampung Banggol, Peradong, Kuala Terengganu on 7 April 1981, and thereafter his image appeared on posters on the walls of PAS offices across the nation at the same time.

Hadi claimed that UMNO perpetuated the unIslamic rule of colonialism, and therefore the struggle of PAS and its supporters against UMNO is jihad and that those who died in the struggle are al-shahid (martyrs).

Later in 1983, an Amanat Hadi poster was used in the Selising by-election in Kelantan and thereafter became a flagship battle clarion call for PAS in other elections.

In one bold stroke, Hadi drew a line that separates PAS and UMNO.

Indeed, there were separate Imams for daily prayers, separate "kenduris" (wedding feasts etc.), abattoirs, funeral rites, Friday prayers, even separate burial sites.

Families were separated, husbands and wives were separated through an acrimonious divorce, and children left in limbo that eventually led to a large scale division of the Muslim ummah.

Seditious remarks against Christians 
Abdul Hadi Awang has alleged that Christian missionaries have brought their work to Malaysia only after experiencing failure in the West. "Christianity is no longer saleable in countries where the education level is high," he said. Hadi alleged that preachers would often back down from challenges to debate with their Muslim counterparts because "they know they would lose". "This is transgression in the name of religion. It is a danger that must be fought," Hadi said in an article in one of the edition of Harakah released on 18 January 2016.

In December 2020, two Sabahans have filed a lawsuit against  Abdul Hadi Awang as a public interest matter. Maklin Masiau and Lawrence Jomiji Kinsil @ Maximilhian ask the court to find Hadi guilty of violating Section 3 of the Sedition Act. Hadi was appointed the Prime Minister's special envoy to the Middle East on 2 April. The position carries a status equivalent to a minister. It is said to involve advising the Prime Minister on enhancing Malaysia's interests in the region. The duo claims that Hadi had made a seditious statement in PAS newspaper Harakah against Christians and Christian missionaries on 18 January 2016. They said they initiated the lawsuit because the public prosecutor had not charged Hadi for those remarks after four years. They also included various news reports in January 2016 and August 2020 as part of their court filing to support their case. The lawsuit was filed on 9 December in the High Court in Kuala Lumpur. The court papers had been delivered to the PAS headquarters yesterday. The Christian Federation of Malaysia — an umbrella body which represents churches nationwide — questioned the sincerity of PAS' Pasir Puteh MP Nik Muhammad Zawawi Salleh's so-called "apology."

Abdul Hadi Awang has applied to quash two Sabahans' originating summons over the PAS president's alleged seditious remark against Christians published in a newspaper, five years ago.

Remarks against Joe Biden 
On 30 January 2021, former deputy foreign affairs minister Marzuki Yahya has criticised Abdul Hadi Awang over his comments on the new administration in the United States. Hadi had said having a new president in the White House was meaningless for Muslim countries as President Joe Biden will continue with Zionist-influenced policies. He had also said the only difference between Biden and his predecessor Donald Trump was Biden's softer and more diplomatic approach. Marzuki said Hadi's remarks could be seen as an attempt to disrupt bilateral ties between Malaysia and the US. He added that Malaysia always held to the principle of non-intervention in another country's domestic affairs. A principle of Malaysia's foreign policy was to resolve any disputes through negotiations.

Personal life
Tuan Guru Abdul Hadi Awang established a household with 'Puan Seri Hajah Zainab binti Awang Ngah in 1976. His second marriage was in 1991 to Dr. Norzita Taat. The result of his marriage with his two wives was 14 children, 11 from his first wife; three from his second wife.

His eldest son, Ustaz Muhammad Khalil Abdul Hadi, is an alumnus of Al-Eman University, Yemen and currently holds the post of PAS Dewan Pemuda's chief and chairman of the International Lajnah, the PAS Dewan Pemuda.

Election results

Writing results

International recognition
Abdul Hadi Awang has been listed as one of the world's 500 most influential Muslims by The Royal Islamic Strategic Studies Centre based in Amman, Jordan. He was given this recognition in the category of Preachers & Spiritual Guides The Muslim 500: The World's 500 Most Influential Muslims 2016 edition.

Honours

Honours of Malaysia
  :
  Commander of the Order of Loyalty to the Crown of Malaysia (PSM) – Tan Sri (2021)
  :
  Member Grand Companion of the Order of Sultan Mahmud I of Terengganu (SSMT) – Dato' Seri (2001)

Character awards 
 On 15 April 2011, he was awarded the 'Alim Rabbani' award by Yala Islamic University, Pattani, and Thailand in conjunction with the Multaqa Muslimat Yala Islamic University. He is the first overseas Thai to receive the recognition.
 On 26 September 2014, he was selected as the Terengganu Tani Icon 2014 in the Terengganu Farmers, Raiders and Fishermen Carnivals 2014 at Itqanul Muluk Square, Kuala Berang, Terengganu.
 On 16 May 2015, he was awarded the "Murabbi Ummah Tokoh" Award in conjunction with the Malaysian Islamic Educators Association 3.0 organized by the National Educator Awakening Association Movement at the Kedah State PAS Complex.
On 1 September 2019, he was awarded the 'Tokoh Maal Hijrah Terengganu' award by the Sultan of Terengganu in conjunction with the new year of 1441 according to Islamic Calendar.

Recognition through writing
 Jamhuri Badiuzzaman, Haji Abdul Hadi Awang : Hamba Allah Pemimpin Ummah, Pustaka Bunda, 1984.
 Mohd Nasir Awang, Masa Untuk Tok Guru Buktikan - PAS Mampu Pimpin Malaysia. Penerbitan Pemuda, 2000
 Mohd Nasir Awang, Terengganu Lepasi Pantang - Kuasa Yang Menjerat?, Rangkaian Minda Publishing, Julai 2001
 Riduan Mohamad Nor, Abdul Hadi Awang : Murabbi, Ideolouge, Pemimpin. Jundi Resources, 2011
 Mohamed Jusoh, Prinsip Haji Hadi BYG Publishers & Distribuors. 2016

Notes

References
 Farish Ahmad Noor, Islam Embedded: The Historical Development of the Democratic Action Party DAP, 1951–2003, Malaysian Sociological Research Institute, 2004, 
 Haddad, Yvonne Yazbeck, Voll, John Obert, Esposito, John L., The Contemporary Islamic Revival: A Critical Survey and Bibliography, Greenwood Publishing Group, 1991, 
 Hooker, Virginia Matheson, Othman, Norani, Kessler, Clive S., Malaysia: Islam, Society and Politics, Institute of Southeast Asian Studies, 2003, 
 Saw, Swee-Hock, K. Kesavapany, Malaysia: Recent Trends and Challenges, Institute of Southeast Asian Studies, 2006,

External links
 President of PAS official website

|-

|-

|-

|-

|-

1947 births
Living people
People from Terengganu
Malaysian people of Malay descent
Malaysian Muslims
Sunni Muslim scholars of Islam
Islamic democracy activists
Malaysian Muslim Brotherhood members
Presidents of Malaysian Islamic Party
Members of the Dewan Rakyat
Malaysian Leaders of the Opposition
Members of the Terengganu State Legislative Assembly
Terengganu state executive councillors
Chief Ministers of Terengganu
Islamic University of Madinah alumni
Al-Azhar University alumni
21st-century Malaysian politicians
International Union of Muslim Scholars members
Anti-Christian sentiment in Asia
Commanders of the Order of Loyalty to the Crown of Malaysia